Flight 821 may refer to

Delta Air Lines Flight 821, crashed on 25 March 1969
Aeroflot Flight 821, crashed on 14 September 2008

0821